Tonyn was launched at Newfoundland in 1779 as Plato. Plato was renamed to Tonyn in 1781. She then traded with North America and as a West Indiaman. From 1797 she made two voyages as a slave ship in the triangular trade in enslaved people. She was captured and recaptured in 1798 on her first voyage, and sunk on her second circa 1800 as she was returning home.

Career
Tonyn was launched as Plato and renamed in 1781. Missing pages in extant issues of Lloyd's Register (LR) has resulted in her first appearing in LR in 1781.

Because a second , and a third , also of about 200 tons (bm), were sailing out of Liverpool, there was some initial confusion between the three vessels.

1st enslaving voyage (1797–1798): Captain Thomas Smith acquired a letter of marque on 15 April 1797. He sailed from Liverpool on 12 May, bound for Calabar. Tonyn arrived at St Croix on 16 December with 314 captives.

At the time Saint Croix was a Danish colony. In 1792, the Danish government passed a law that would outlaw Danish participation in the trans-Atlantic enslaving trade, from early 1803 on. This led the government in the Danish West Indies to encourage the importation of captives prior to the ban taking effect. One measure that it took was to open the trade to foreign vessels. Records for the period 1796 to 1799 show that 24 British enslaving ships, most of them from Liverpool, arrived at St Croix and imported 6,781 captives.

Tonyn apparently sailed from St Croix to Calabar. There she picked up a cargo of palm oil and "elephant's teeth" (ivory tusks). On 14 March 1798 the French privateer Buonaparte captured her. Tonyn, Smith, master, prize to Canada, arrived at Plymouth on 29 March. She arrived back at Liverpool on 6 May. By the time she arrived at Plymouth, only one of her original crew remained aboard Tonyn. She had sailed from Liverpool with 29 crew members and had suffered eight crew deaths on her voyage. 

2nd enslaving voyage (1798–1799): Captain James Towers sailed from Liverpool on 21 November 1798, bound for the Congo River. Tonyn arrived at Kingston on 22 August 1799 with 299 captives, having first stopped at Martinique. She may have embarked 326.

Fate
In January 1800 Lloyd's List reported that Tonyn, Towers, master, had been sunk in Waterford harbour after having been run into. She had been on her way from Jamaica to Liverpool. She had left Liverpool with 38 crew members and she had suffered 16 crew deaths on her voyage. Her entry in the 1800 volume of the Register of Shipping carried the annotation "Lost".

In 1800, 34 British slaving vessels were lost, at least four were lost on the homeward leg of their voyage. In 1800, 133 British vessels sailed on enslaving voyages. The 34 vessels lost represent a 26% loss rate.

Note

Citations

References
 
 
 
 
 

1779 ships
Age of Sail merchant ships of England
Captured ships
Liverpool slave ships
Maritime incidents in 1800